Chidi may refer to:
Chidi (god), an ancient Chinese deity

People

Given name
Chidi Ahanotu, American American-rule-football player
Chidi Edeh, Nigerian footballer
Chidi Imoh, Nigerian sprinter
Chidi Iwuoma, American American-rule-football player
Chidi Ngwaba, British medical doctor
Chidi Nwanu, Nigerian footballer
Chidi Odiah, Nigerian footballer
Chidi Onyemah, Nigerian footballer
Chidi Osondu, Nigerian-American record producer and songwriter

Surname
Lovina Sylvia Chidi, Nigerian and German chess player
Pascal Chidi (born 2000), Nigerian footballer

Fictional characters 
Chidi Anagonye, a fictional character on the U.S. TV series The Good Place

See also
 
 
 Chedli